Pine nuts, also called piñón, pinoli, pignoli, bondoq (Tunisian: [ˈbʊndɔq]) or chilgoza, are the edible seeds of pines (family Pinaceae, genus Pinus). According to the Food and Agriculture Organization, only 29 species provide edible nuts, while 20 are traded locally or internationally owing to their seed size being large enough to be worth harvesting; in other pines, the seeds are also edible but are too small to be of notable value as human food.

Species and geographic spread

In Asia, two species, in particular, are widely harvested: Korean pine (Pinus koraiensis) in northeast Asia (the most important species in international trade) and chilgoza pine (P. gerardiana) in the western Himalaya. Four other species, Siberian pine (P. sibirica), Siberian dwarf pine (P. pumila), Chinese white pine (P. armandii) and lacebark pine (P. bungeana), are also used to a lesser extent. Russia is the largest producer of P. sibirica nuts in the world, followed by either Mongolia or Afghanistan. They each produce over  annually, most of it exported to China.

Pine nuts produced in Europe mostly come from the stone pine (P. pinea), which has been cultivated for its nuts for over 5,000 years. Pine nuts have been harvested from wild trees for far longer. The Swiss pine (P. cembra) is also used, to a very small extent.

In North America, the main species are three of the pinyon pines: Colorado pinyon (P. edulis), single-leaf pinyon (P. monophylla), and Mexican pinyon (P. cembroides). The other eight pinyon species are used to a small extent, as is gray pine (P. sabineana), Coulter pine (P. coulteri), Torrey pine (P. torreyana), sugar pine (P. lambertiana) and Parry pinyon (P. quadrifolia). Here, the nuts themselves are known by the Spanish name for the pinyon pine, piñón (plural: piñones).

In the United States, pine nuts are mainly harvested by Native American and Hispano communities, particularly in the Western United States and Southwestern United States, by the Shoshone, Paiute, Navajo, Pueblo, Hopi, Washoe, and Hispanos of New Mexico. Certain treaties negotiated by tribes and laws in Nevada guarantee Native Americans' right to harvest pine nuts, and the state of New Mexico protects the use of the word piñon for use with pine nuts from certain species of indigenous New Mexican pines.

Species list

For those seeking to grow edible landscapes, these are the more commonly used species.  
Old World
Pinus armandii – Chinese white pine 
Pinus bungeana – lacebark pine
Pinus cembra – Swiss pine
Pinus gerardiana – Chilgoza pine 
Pinus koraiensis – Korean pine 
Pinus pinea – Mediterranean stone pine 
Pinus pumila – Siberian dwarf pine 
Pinus sibirica – Siberian pine  
New World
Pinus albicaulis – Whitebark pine
Pinus cembroides – Mexican pinyon
Pinus coulteri – Coulter pine
Pinus culminicola – Potosi pinyon
Pinus edulis – Two-needle piñon or Colorado pinyon (when grown in Colorado) 
Pinus johannis – Johann's pinyon (includes P. discolor – Border pinyon)
Pinus monophylla – Single-leaf pinyon
Pinus orizabensis – Orizaba pinyon
Pinus quadrifolia – Four-leaved pinyon or Parry pinyon
Pinus remota – Papershell pinyon or Texas pinyon
Pinus sabiniana – California foothill pine

Pollination and seed development
The pine nut (seed) species will take a time that depends on the exact species (e.g., 36 months for a stone pine seed) to complete its maturity; to reach full maturity, the environmental conditions must be favorable for the tree and its cone.

For some American species, development begins in early spring with pollination. A tiny cone, about the size of a small marble, will form from mid-spring to the end of summer; the premature cone will then become and remain dormant (with a cessation of growth) until the following spring. The cone will then commence growth until it reaches maturity near the end of summer. The mature piñon pine cone is ready to harvest ten days before the green cone begins to open. A cone is harvested by placing it in a burlap bag and exposing it to a heat source such as the sun to begin drying. It takes about 20 days until the cone fully opens. Once it is fully open and dry, the seed can be easily extracted in various ways. The most common and practical extraction method used is the repeated striking of the burlap bag containing the cone(s) against a rough surface to cause the cone(s) to shatter, leaving just the job of separating by hand the seed from the residue within the bag.

Another option for harvesting is to wait until the cone opens on the tree (as it naturally will) and harvest the cone from the piñon pine, followed by the extracting process mentioned above. Fallen seeds can also be gathered beneath the trees.

Ecology and status
Because pine nuts are an important food source for many animals, overharvesting of pine nuts threatens local ecosystems, an effect occurring during the early 21st century with increased culinary uses for pine nuts. In the United States, millions of hectares of productive pinyon pine woods have been destroyed due to conversion of lands, and in China and Russia, destructive harvesting techniques (such as breaking off whole branches to harvest the cones) and removal of trees for timber have led to losses in production capacity.

Elevation and pinecone production
The elevation of the pinyon pine is an important determinant of the quantity of pine cone production and, therefore, will largely determine the number of pine nuts the tree will yield.

This is due to higher temperatures at elevations lower than  during the spring, which dry up humidity and moisture content (particularly snow packs) that provide for the tree throughout the spring and summer, causing little nourishment for pine cone maturity.

Although several other environmental factors determine the conditions of the ecosystem (such as clouds and rain), the trees tend to abort cones without sufficient water. High humidity encourages cone development. There are certain topographical areas found in lower elevations, such as shaded canyons, where the humidity remains constant throughout the spring and summer, allowing pine cones to fully mature and produce seed.

At elevations above , the temperature substantially drops, drastically affecting the state of the dormant cone.  During the winter, frequent dramatic changes in temperature, drying, and gusty winds make the cones susceptible to freeze-drying that permanently damages them; in this case, growth is stunted, and the seeds deteriorate.

Physical characteristics

When first extracted from the pine cone, they are covered with a hard shell (seed coat), thin in some species and thick in others. The nutrition is stored in the embryo (sporophyte) in the center. Although a nut in the culinary sense, in the botanical sense, pine nuts are seeds; being a gymnosperm, they lack a carpel (fruit) outside.

The shell must be removed before the pine nut can be eaten. Unshelled pine nuts have a long shelf life if kept dry and refrigerated; shelled nuts (and unshelled nuts in warm conditions) deteriorate rapidly, becoming rancid within a few weeks or even days in warm, humid conditions. Pine nuts are commercially available in the shelled form, but due to poor storage, they can have poor flavor and maybe already rancid at the time of purchase. Consequently, pine nuts are often frozen to preserve their flavor.

European pine nuts may be distinguished from Asian ones by their greater length than girth; Asian pine nuts are stubbier, shaped somewhat like long kernels of corn.  The American piñon nuts are known for their large size and ease of shelling. In the United States, Pinus edulis, the hard shell of New Mexico and Colorado, became a sought-after species due to the trading post system and the Navajo people who used the nuts as a means of commerce. The Italian pine nut (P. pinea) was brought to the United States by immigrants and became a favored treat along the East Coast in the early 1930s, when bumper crops of American pine nuts were readily available at low prices.

Nutrition

When dried for eating, pine nuts are 2% water, 13% carbohydrates, 14% protein, and 68% fat (table). In a  reference serving, dried pine nuts supply  of food energy and are a rich source (20% or more of the Daily Value, DV) of numerous micronutrients, particularly manganese (419% DV), phosphorus (82% DV), magnesium (71% DV), zinc (67% DV), copper (65% DV), vitamin E (62% DV), vitamin K (51% DV), and the B vitamins, thiamin and niacin (29–35% DV), among others (table).

Culinary uses
Pine nuts have been eaten in Europe and Asia since the Paleolithic period. They are frequently added to meat, fish, salads, and vegetable dishes or baked into bread.

In Italian, they are called pinoli (in the US, they are often called pignoli, but in Italy, pignolo is actually a word far more commonly used to describe a fussy, overly fastidious or extremely meticulous person) and are an essential component of Italian pesto sauce; the upsurge in the popularity of this sauce since the 1990s has increased the visibility of the nut in America, primarily on the West Coast. Torta della nonna (literally "granny's cake") is a generic Italian dish name that in most families indicates an old family recipe for any cake but often is used for a tart or a pie filled with custard, topped with pine nuts and optionally dusted with icing sugar. Pignoli cookies, an Italian American specialty confection (in Italy, these would be called biscotti ai pinoli), are made of almond flour formed into a dough similar to that of a macaroon and then topped with pine nuts.

In Catalonia, a sweet is made of small marzipan balls covered with pine nuts, painted with egg, and lightly cooked, and those are called "Panellets". Pine nuts are also featured in the salade landaise of southwestern France. Nevada, or Great Basin, pine nut has a sweet fruity flavor and is promoted for its large size, sweet flavor, and ease of peeling. Pine nuts are also widely used in Middle Eastern cuisine, reflected in a diverse range of dishes such as kibbeh, sambusak, and fatayer, desserts such as baklava, and many others.

Throughout Europe and the Middle East, the pine nuts used are traditionally from Pinus pinea (stone pine). They are easily distinguished from the Asian pine nuts by their more slender shape and more homogeneous flesh. Because of the lower price, Asian pine nuts are also often used, especially in cheaper preparations. Pine nuts contain thiamine (vitamin B1) and protein.

Pine nut coffee, known as piñón (Spanish for pine nut), is a specialty found in the southwest United States, especially New Mexico, and is typically a dark roast coffee having a deep, nutty flavor; roasted and lightly salted pine nuts can often be found sold on the side of the road in cities across New Mexico to be used for this purpose, as well as a snack.

Pine nut oil is added to foods for flavor.

Taste disturbances
Some raw pine nuts can cause taste disturbances, lasting from a few days to a few weeks after consumption. A bitter, metallic, unpleasant taste is reported. There are no known lasting effects, with the United States Food and Drug Administration reporting that there are "no apparent adverse clinical side effects". Raw nuts from Pinus armandii, mainly in China, maybe the cause of the problem. Metallic taste disturbance is typically reported 1–3 days after ingestion, being worse on day two and typically lasting up to two weeks. Cases are self-limited and resolve without treatment.

Other uses
Pine nuts have long been a dietary staple in some Native American tribes. Today, though some tribes still use pine nuts in traditional cooking, others use the hard outer shell of the pine nut as a bead for decorative purposes in traditional regalia and jewelry. In the Great Basin area of the US, collecting pine nuts is a protected right through state law and treaty.

In northern California, pine nuts are collected from the grey pine or bull pine. Tribes burn designs into the hard shell, reflecting the same design they use in baskets; however, they are often left blank or burned to blacken. These are more often used in women's regalia and jewelry.

See also
 Assidat Zgougou – a Tunisian dessert made of pine nuts
 Jatjuk – a Korean porridge prepared using pine nuts
 List of edible seeds

References

Further reading

External links

 
 

Edible nuts and seeds
Pinus
Plants used in Native American cuisine